The 2011 Ulster Grand Prix races were held on the Dundrod Circuit between 7–13 August 2011 in County Antrim, Northern Ireland.

Results

Practice times

Race results

Race 6; 2011 1000cc Superbike Race 2 final standings
Saturday 13 August 2011 6 laps – 44.406 miles Dundrod Circuit

Fastest Lap: William Dunlop, 3' 24.159 130.506 mph on lap 4

See also
 North West 200
 Isle of Man TT
 Manx Grand Prix

References

External links
 Official website

2011
2011 in British motorsport
2011 in Northern Ireland sport
August 2011 sports events in the United Kingdom